Banyas may refer to:

Banias, a location in the Golan Heights, ancient Paneas
Baniyas, a town on the Syrian coast, ancient Balanea